() was, in the Austro-Hungarian Navy (1786-1918), an enlisted rank and, in the Imperial German Navy, a non-commissioned officer (NCO) rank.

Austria-Hungary 

Bootsmannsmaat was in the k.u.k. Austro-Hungarian Navy (1786 until 1918) equivalent to the rank Corporal of the  k.u.k. Common Army. The sequence of ranks was as follows:

Rudergast - OR3 (en: Helmsman)
Bootsmannsmaat - OR4 (en: boatswain's mate)

Germany

The Bootsmannsmaat was equivalent to the rank of Unteroffizier in Heer und Luftwaffe.

Regarding the particular career or assignment the sequence of ranks (both of them OR5 / second mates) and the grade description was established as follows:
 for Maate (en: mates) – Bootsmannsmaat (en: boatswain's mate), Feuerwerksmaat (en: firework's mate), Maschinistenmaat (en: engineman's mate), or Steuermannsmaat (en: steersman's mate)
 for Obermaate (en: senior mates) – Oberbootsmannsmaat (en: senior boatswain's mate), Oberfeuerwerksmaat (en: senior firework's mate), Obermaschinistenmaat (en: senior enginemen's mate), or Obersteuermannsmaat (en: senior steersman's mate)

Russian Empire 

Similar to the naming in German speaking naval forces, in the Imperial Russian Navy (IRN) of the  Russian Empire there was the rank Bootsmannsmaat (original ) as well. However, it was an OR6-rank equivalent to the Senior unteroffizier (ru: «Старший унтерофицер» (ОR6)).
The sequence of ranks was as follows:
Quartiermeister - OR4 (en: Quartermaster / ru:Квартирмейстер)
Bootsmannsmaat - OR6 (en: boatswain's mate /ru: Боцманмат)
Bootsmann - OR7 (en: Boatswain / ru: Боцман)
Gardemarin - OR8 (en: Guard marine / ru: Гардемарин)

References 

Naval ranks of Germany
Military ranks of Russia
Military ranks of Austria
Austro-Hungarian Army
Imperial Russian Navy